No Apologies may refer to:

Film
No Apologies, a 2012 documentary film by Ashley Morrison

Music

Albums  
 No Apologies (The Eyeliners album), 2005
 No Apologies (Trapt album), 2010
 No Apologies, a 2006 album by The Right Brothers
 No Apologies: The Chung King Sessions, a 1992 bootleg album by Judge

Songs 
 "No Apologies" (Alanis Morissette song), 1993
 "No Apologies" (JoJo song) or "Fuck Apologies", 2016
 "No Apologies", by Bon Jovi from Greatest Hits, 2010
 "No Apologies", by Eminem from Eminem Presents: The Re-Up, 2006
 "No Apologies", by Joni Mitchell from Taming the Tiger, 1998
 "No Apologies", by Papa Roach from Ego Trip, 2022
 "No Apologies", by Sum 41 from Underclass Hero, 2007

Music video
 No Apologies, a 2005 performance video by Bleed the Dream

See also 
 No Apology, a 2010 book by Mitt Romney 
 Non-apology apology, an inauthentic apology